Yates Cider Mill is a cider mill in Rochester, Michigan. The mill traces its roots to 1863, when it was known as Yates Grist Mill. In order for the mill to utilize water power, the Yates Dam was built. The Yates Mill became the Yates Cider Mill in 1876 when a cider press was installed into the existing water powered process and the Mill began producing apple cider. Custom apple pressing was done for local farmers, orchard owners and landowners who brought their apples to the Mill.

Water power
Today visitors to the Yates Cider Mill can watch cider being made, powered by a 26-inch turbine, which was installed in 1894. It is the original turbine from 1894 that is still in use today at the Mill.  Recently, the turbine was removed, refurbished and reinstalled in order to preserve history and continue with the original tradition of making cider.  A 58-inch culvert carries the water that provides the water power for the turbine underground from the dam across the street to the Mill.

Making Apple Cider

Yates cider is made without preservatives, blending as many as six different varieties of apples. The process of cider making starts with apples arriving in 20-bushel boxes on a flatbed truck from Michigan orchards. A forklift unloads these boxes, as each weighs about 1000 pounds. The apples are then unloaded into a dumper-washer inspection area where cleaning, grinding and pressing begins.  The apples not scheduled for direct use are placed in cold storage at the mill. The rest of the apples are cleaned, taken up on an elevator and dropped into a cone-shaped hopper that holds 150 bushels of apples and is located on the second floor of the cider mill. Below, on the first floor, the remainder of the operation takes place.

A handle, located on the first floor, controls a trap door on the bottom of the hopper, which allows the fruit to fall through to the first floor chute. On their way down the chute, the apples are chopped into small pieces, about four bushels at a time, and are then placed in a special nylon blanket. This process continues until up to 12 blankets are stacked on top of one another.
The layers of chopped apples are on a large turntable that rotates under the apple press. The press used at Yates Cider Mill is called a ‘screw press’ because large screws turn to make the press go down, putting 50 tons of pressure on the blankets of chopped apples for 15 minutes. As the press goes down on the blankets, the cider comes through the weave in the cloth leaving the seeds, peelings and pulp inside the blanket. All by-products are then discarded down a chute in the floor and into a small railroad car under the mill. Periodically, the car is transferred to the dump area. The cider then flows from the press to chilled mixing tanks. From there, the cider is filtered to remove any and all small apple particles. UV treatment is the last step before bottling. In one autumn weekend, the mill juices over half a million apples and can produce 300 gallons of cider an hour.

Media
In October 2009, Yates Cider Mill was featured on Food Network’s Unwrapped.  It was a special behind-the-scenes episode entitled, “Fall Favorites".

References

Buildings and structures in Oakland County, Michigan
Cider
Grinding mills in Michigan
Tourist attractions in Oakland County, Michigan
1863 establishments in Michigan